

Events
Charles IV, Holy Roman Emperor, commissions a Landbuch, a survey of his possessions.

New books
John Barbour – The Brus
Catalan Atlas, attributed to Cresques Abraham

Births
probable – Juan Alfonso de Baena, troubadour (died c. 1434)

Deaths
February 9 – Chūgan Engetsu, Japanese poet (born 1300)
December 21 – Giovanni Boccaccio, Italian writer (born 1313)

References

 
Literature
Literature by year